was the 32nd Chief of Staff of the Japan Ground Self-Defense Force, the de facto army of Japan. He was promoted to four-star General and assumed the position on August 5, 2011.

Career
Kimizuka was born and raised in Kanagawa Prefecture. He attended the National Defense Academy of Japan, graduating in 1976 into the Ground Self-Defense Force. Kimizuka was initially trained in field artillery, and served in a number of artillery command roles at the company-grade and field-grade levels. Throughout his career, he has attended a number of military schools including Japanese Ranger School, Japanese Airborne School, and the United States Army Command and General Staff College.

Promoted to Colonel in 1995, Kimizuka served as the Commander of the 10th Artillery Regiment at JGSDF Camp Toyokawa. In 1999, he became Chief of Defense Planning Division, Ground Staff Office.

Promoted to Major General in 2001, Kimizuka served as the Vice Chief of Staff, Western Army in Kumamoto Prefecture. In 2003, he became Commander of the 1st Combined Brigade at JGSDF Camp Naha. In 2006, he became Chief of Staff of the Central Army at JGSDF Camp Itami.

Promoted to Lieutenant General in 2007, Kimizuka served as the Commander of the 8th Division. Later, in 2009, he became the Commander of the North Eastern Army, headquartered in Sendai. After the 2011 Tōhoku earthquake and tsunami, Kimizuka led Joint Task Force - Tohoku, a massive 100,000 soldier relief effort coordinated with American forces in Operation Tomodachi. He died on December 28, 2015, of lung cancer.

References

2015 deaths
Chiefs of Staff of the Japan Ground Self-Defense Force
1952 births
United States Army Command and General Staff College alumni
Foreign recipients of the Legion of Merit
National Defense Academy of Japan alumni
Military personnel from Kanagawa Prefecture